Kuttikkuppayam is a 1964 Indian Malayalam-language drama film directed by M. Krishnan Nair and written by Moidu Padiyath based on his novel Kaneer Panthal. The film was a major commercial success at the box office that year and also had a successful soundtrack composed by M. S. Baburaj.

Plot

Jabbar marries Zubaida against the wish of his mother, who had plans to bring her niece Safia as her son's bride. Zubaida is accused of being infertile by her mother-in-law and other members of the family.

Jabbar loves his wife, but gradually falls to the constant taunts, manipulations and emotional blackmailing over not having a child and blaming his wife for that. Jabbar finally decides to get separated from his wife.

Jabbar marries Safia, while Zubaida's father Kareem forces his daughter to marry Siddique. The marriage broker does not tell Siddique that Zubaida had married earlier. When he learns of this, he sends Zubaida back home. After Kareem dies, Siddique brings back Zubaida and they leave to Madras where Siddique gets a job.

Zubaida gives birth to a child. Jabbar is surprised to hear of this from a relative. He gathers courage and undergoes a medical examination that confirms his infertility. At the same time, Safia becomes pregnant. His own cousin is held responsible for this.

Jabbar reaches Madras in search of Zubaida and Siddique and meets them at a festival ground. Zubaida's child was on a merry go round. Suddenly the machine goes out of control. Jabbar jumps in to save the life of Zubaida's child, but is fatally injured. Jabbar breathes his last in the presence of Zubaida.

Cast
Prem Nazir 
Madhu 
Sheela 
Adoor Bhasi 
Ambika 
Murali
Nilambur Ayisha 
Philomina 
Santha Devi

Soundtrack

Trivia

This was the debut film of Philomina. This was also the debut Malayalam film of playback singer L. R. Eswari.

References

External links
 

1964 films
1960s Malayalam-language films
Films directed by M. Krishnan Nair
Films scored by M. S. Baburaj